Zul Faden, popularly known as Zul F, (born Haji ZulFakhari bin Muksin on October 24, 1980) is Brunei's top male singer and actor. Dubbed "darling" of the local media, he gained recognition after winning P2F, Brunei's version of the Idol series, and was the first Bruneian artist to appear on MTV Asia in 2007, with his video Dari Mata.

Career Highlights

Zul began his music career as a member of Bruneian band Pneumatic Soulz. The group's debut performance was as the opening act for Malaysian artists Elite and X-Factor.

After going solo, he became a contestant and eventual winner of the first season of P2F in 2005. This made him a prominent figure in the local music scene as, prior to P2F, most Bruneians only listened to Malaysian artists.

Zul's first music video, "Dari Mata" screened on MTV Asia in 2007. He was the first local Malay Bruneian to release a music video regionally and internationally. The song then became an instant hit.

As an established local artist and the fact that he has notched up noticeable successes as winner of the inaugural P2F reality show in Brunei(equivalent to the Idol series), he became the Ambassador / Image Model for Toyota Vios in 2008. An endorsement contract of this nature is the first of its kind for a local Bruneian artist.

He released his 1st singles album, "Bersama Bintang" in 2006. One of the songs from the album, "Engkau Adalah Cinta" was recorded in Kuala Lumpur, Malaysia. The same song actually made its debut as he was invited to perform at Selayang Stadium, Kuala Lumpur, Malaysia in December 2005.

Zul was featured as Guest Performer in the MoU project (a joint collaboration between RTB, Brunei & Suria, Singapore artist), "Rhapsodi Hitz". The event took place in Singapore.

Four years later, he then released his debut album "Memori Cinta Zul Faden" (Love Memories) in 2011. A few months prior to the release of his debut album, Zul was invited to perform at the ASEAN Tourism Fair in Osaka, Japan, in which he was given the opportunity to perform new songs from his upcoming album.

Within the same year in 2011, he was appointed Goodwill Ambassador and Image Model for Jerudong Park Playground, Brunei's Theme Park, together with Brunei's Top Female Artist, Maria.

In 2013, he was featured in Brunei's 1st local movie "Ada Apa Dengan Rina" as he co-starred with other established Bruneian actors and actresses. The movie spawned a "Special Jury Award" during the Asean International Film Festival & Awards (AIFFA) 2013 held in Sarawak, Malaysia.

Since then he has been given lead roles in several local telemovies such as "Ketika Mata Bertasbih", "Biru Pesisir Hati" and "Doa dan Sejadah". He also co-starred in the popular 13-episode local TV drama entitled "Rintihanku".

Discography

SINGLES (2005 TO PRESENT):
1. Ku Bangun
2. Bersama Bintang
3. Engkau Adalah Cinta
4. Dari Mata
5. Chantik
6. Erti Cinta
7. Cintamu Cintaku Satu (duet with Putri Norizah)
8. Will I Ever
9. This Feeling
10. I Don't Want Love Songs 
11. Manaku Pergi
12. Speechless
13. Jangan Sesali
14. Kasih (duet with Maria)
15. Sepi
16. Cobalah Tuk Setia
17. You're The One (with Jazz Hassan)
18. Come Back
19. Just Wanna Dance (feat. Kuj)

ALBUMS:
 Memori Cinta Zul Faden (Love Memories) – 2011

Awards
He was named the Best Male Vocalist at the 2006–2007 Pelangi Awards (Brunei's Top Award show). He was nominated for the same award in 2009.

He was named the Best Male Vocalist for the second time at the 2010–2011 Pelangi Award.

He was voted 'Popular Male Artist' at the RTB 2008 Awards.

Philanthropy
In 2005, Zul was involved with the Asia Aid Charity Concert for tsunami victims.

In 2009, he performed at the Sounds of Hope Charity Gala Night on October 3, 2009. The concert aimed to raise awareness about poverty in Brunei.

In 2011, he performed at the "Enlightening Japan / Brunei Night" charity concert to raise funds for tsunami victims; live broadcast on Nippon TV, Japan.

References

Living people
Bruneian male singers
1980 births
Bruneian male actors